Melissa Griffin Dalton is an American defense official who currently serves as the assistant secretary of defense for homeland defense and hemispheric affairs in the Biden administration.

Education 
Dalton earned a Bachelor of Arts degree in foreign affairs from the University of Virginia and a Master of Arts in international relations from the Paul H. Nitze School of Advanced International Studies at Johns Hopkins University.

Career 
Dalton began her career as an intelligence analyst at the Defense Intelligence Agency. She then joined the Office of the Under Secretary of Defense for Policy, where she specialized in policy related to Syria and Lebanon. She also served as a senior advisor to the commander of the International Security Assistance Force in Kabul. After serving in United States Department of Defense during the Bush and Obama administrations, she joined the Center for Strategic and International Studies as a senior fellow and deputy director. In January 2021, Dalton was selected to serve as principal deputy assistant secretary of defense for strategy, plans, and capabilities. In July 2021, Dalton was selected to manage the Nuclear Posture Review.

Nomination to Defense Department under Biden
Dalton was nominated to serve as assistant secretary of defense for homeland defense and Americas' security affairs in August 2021. Hearings were held on her nomination on January 13, 2022 by the Senate's Armed Services Committee. On February 1, 2022, the committee reported her nomination favorably. Dalton was officially confirmed by the Senate on March 1, 2022, and started her position on March 4, 2022.

References 

Living people
University of Virginia alumni
Johns Hopkins University alumni
Paul H. Nitze School of Advanced International Studies alumni
United States Department of Defense officials
Obama administration personnel
Biden administration personnel
Year of birth missing (living people)
George W. Bush administration personnel